Sima is a rural locality (a selo) and the administrative center of Simskoye Rural Settlement, Yuryev-Polsky District, Vladimir Oblast, Russia. The population was 1,537 as of 2010. There are 17 streets.

Geography 
Sima is located on the Simka River, 24 km north of Yuryev-Polsky (the district's administrative centre) by road. Bildino is the nearest rural locality.

References 

Rural localities in Yuryev-Polsky District